Sundowner is the sixth studio album by American indie rock musician Kevin Morby, released on October 16, 2020, on Dead Oceans.

Background
Sundowner was written at Morby's home in Kansas where he lives with his partner Katie Crutchfield, and which they nicknamed 'The Little Los Angeles'. The album was recorded in January 2019 with producer Brad Cook at Sonic Ranch in Tornillo, Texas. In the meantime, Morby released his fifth studio album, Oh My God (2019), and went on tour in support of it. In 2020, during the COVID-19 pandemic, Morby and Cook put the finishing touches on Sundowner from their respective homes.

In an essay announcing the album, Morby described the album as his "attempt to put the Middle American twilight—its beauty profound, though not always immediate—into sound."

Release
Sundowner was announced on September 1, 2020. The album's first single "Campfire", was released the same day. "Don't Underestimate Midwest American Sun" and "Wander" were released as singles on September 23, 2020. "Sundowner" was released as a single on October 7, 2020. The album was released on October 16, 2020 via Dead Oceans.

A Night at the Little Los Angeles
On October 8, 2021, Morby released A Night at the Little Los Angeles, a collection of 4-track demo versions of the songs on Sundowner. It features demos of all the songs except "Jamie", which is replaced with a demo version of Morby's standalone single "U.S. Mail".

Critical reception

At Metacritic, which assigns a normalized rating out of 100 to reviews from mainstream critics, Sundowner received an average score of 73 based on 12 reviews, indicating "generally favorable reviews".

Fred Thomas of AllMusic wrote, "Its gentle melancholy and unhurried tempos slowly melt into a sustained atmosphere, offering some of Morby's gentlest and most captivating songs." Ross Horton of musicOMH called it "Morby's Harvest Moon, his Nebraska, his Hejira – a statement of intent made in the quietest way possible."

Year-end lists

Track listing

Personnel
 Kevin Morby – vocals, guitar, drums, piano, mellotron, pump organ, insert photo
 Brad Cook – production, bass, keys, drum machine, backing vocals (track 2)
 Katie Crutchfield – vocals (tracks 4, 6)
 James Krivchenia – percussion, backing vocals (track 2)
 Jerry Ordonez – mixing, engineering
 Brent Lambert – mastering
 Johnny Eastland – cover photo
 Matt Lief Anderson – insert photo
 Mike Krol – layout, design

References

External links
 Essay by Kevin Morby about Sundowner at Dead Oceans

2020 albums
Kevin Morby albums
Dead Oceans albums
Albums recorded at Sonic Ranch